Kivilõppe is a village in Viljandi Parish, Viljandi County, in southern Estonia. Until the 2017 administrative reform of Estonian municipalities the village was located in Tarvastu Parish. As of 2011 Census, Kivilõppe's population was 35.

Composer Juhan Simm (1885–1959) and  actor, director, diplomat, and journalist  were born in Kivilõppe.

References

Villages in Viljandi County
Kreis Fellin